Frederick Newell may refer to:
Frederick Buckley Newell (1890-1979), American Methodist bishop
Frederick Haynes Newell (1862–1932), American irrigation engineer